Brian Cummings,  is Anniversary Professor in the Department of English and Related Literature at the University of York. He was elected a fellow of the British Academy in 2016.

Selected publications
 Mortal Thoughts: Religion, Secularity and Identity in Shakespeare and Early Modern Culture (Oxford University Press, 2013).
 The Book of Common Prayer: The Texts of 1549, 1559, and 1662 (Oxford University Press, 2011; Oxford World's Classics edition 2013): Runner-Up, Atlantic Book of the Year 2012.
 The Literary Culture of the Reformation: Grammar and Grace (Oxford University Press, 2002; paperback 2007): Times Literary Supplement Book of the Year for 2003.

References 

Living people
Fellows of the British Academy
British academics of English literature
Academics of the University of York
Fellows of Trinity College, Cambridge
Academics of the University of Sussex
Year of birth missing (living people)